The Cairnwell Pass is a mountain pass on the A93 road between Glen Shee, Perthshire, and Braemar, Aberdeenshire, in the Scottish Highlands. The border between the two counties crosses the summit of the pass. Historically, the pass was a drover's route from the Lowlands to the Highlands. The road is often blocked by snow in the winter, with snow gates at Braemar, at the summit (south of the Ski Centre), and at the Spittal of Glenshee.

 south of the summit is the Devil's Elbow, a notorious double-hairpin bend. The often-quoted gradient of 33 percent (1 in 3) is a myth: in reality it is no more than 1 in 6 (17%). The double bend can be seen clearly on Taylor & Skinner's map of 1776, with the 1749 military road already bypassed. The modern road bypasses the hairpin bends, but the old road still exists and its route can be walked, or carefully cycled.

Climate

See also
 List of highest paved roads in Europe
 List of mountain passes

References

Roads in Scotland
Transport in Perth and Kinross
Transport in Aberdeenshire
Mountain passes of Scotland